Michael Patrick Sheetz is a cell biologist, a pioneer of mechanobiology and biomechanics, and a key contributor to the discovery of kinesin. He serves as the Robert A. Welch Distinguished University Chair in Chemistry at the University of Texas Medical Branch, Galveston, the department of biochemistry and molecular biology. He is the William R. Kenan, Jr. Professor Emeritus of Cell Biology at Columbia University, former distinguished professor and the founding director of the Mechanobiology Institute at the National University of Singapore, and former professor at Washington University in St. Louis and Duke University.

In 1968, Sheetz earned a bachelor's degree at Albion College, and in 1972 received his Ph.D. from the California Institute of Technology.

Awards
 2012 Wiley Prize in Biomedical Sciences
 2012 Albert Lasker Award for Basic Medical Research
 2013 Massry Prize
 2014 Keith R. Porter Lecture to American Society for Cell Biology

References

Living people
American biochemists
Columbia University faculty
Recipients of the Albert Lasker Award for Basic Medical Research
Massry Prize recipients
Year of birth missing (living people)
Washington University in St. Louis faculty
Duke University faculty
Albion College alumni
California Institute of Technology alumni